Acrocalymma medicaginis is a plant pathogen that causes root and crown rot in alfalfa. It is found in Australia.

References 

Lophiostomataceae
Fungal plant pathogens and diseases
Eudicot diseases
Fungi described in 1987
Fungi of Australia
Fungi native to Australia